The 1997 Georgia Tech Yellow Jackets football team represented the Georgia Institute of Technology in the 1997 NCAA Division I-A football season. The team's coach was George O'Leary. It played its home games at Bobby Dodd Stadium in Atlanta.

Schedule

References

Georgia Tech
Georgia Tech Yellow Jackets football seasons
Cheez-It Bowl champion seasons
Georgia Tech Yellow Jackets football